Adi Ateca Moceiwaqa Mara Ganilau (1951 – 16 November 2018) was a Fijian public figure, best known as the eldest daughter of the former Prime Minister and President, the late Ratu Sir Kamisese Mara.

Opposition to government legislation 
Ganilau joined her husband and her younger sister, Senator Adi Koila Nailatikau, in opposing the government's controversial Reconciliation, Tolerance, and Unity Bill, which proposed the establishment of a Commission empowered, subject to presidential approval, to compensate victims and pardon perpetrators of the coup d'état of May 2000, in which her father was deposed from the presidency and her sister, then a Minister in the government of Prime Minister Mahendra Chaudhry, was kidnapped and held as a hostage by gunmen led by George Speight, the principal instigator of the coup.  Speaking on 25 June 2005, Ganilau said that the Mara family had not been consulted about the legislation, was opposed to it, and would accept no compensation offered by the Commission to be established.

Ganilau said that her family was still reeling from the effects of the coup.  She thought it "ridiculous" that the government was trying to "excuse people involved in the coup", even after the Fiji Week reconciliation ceremonies that ran from 4 to 11 October 2004, which she called a "failed presentation."  She said that it was "not on." She called it "a forced idea" and questioned the government's motives for promoting it.  "If the move to reconcile and compensate came from the coup perpetrators maybe, I would have given it some thought but coming from the Government is hard to accept," she stated.

Ganilau said she was opposed to granting amnesty to people implicated in coup-related charges.  "It would set a dangerous precedent, that is why I am not condoning it," she declared.

In a further statement on 25 July, Ganilau said that the 2000 coup had not been spontaneous, but a premeditated and carefully planned act, which she accused some members of the present Senate of knowing about in advance.

Biography controversy 
The Fiji Times quoted Ganilau on 8 January 2006 as criticizing the Qarase government for supporting the writing of an independent biography of the life of her father, while working to release from prison the very people who had deposed him.  This was contradictory, she said.  "On one hand they want to praise him but on the other they are working to free those people who ousted him through the Reconciliation Bill."  She reiterated her previously stated opposition to the release of coup-convicts, saying that if alive, her father would have preferred justice to take its course.

Lau Provincial Council controversy 
Ganilau was elected Chairperson of the Lau Provincial Council on 11 July 2011, succeeding her brother, Roko Tevita Uluilakeba Mara. She defeated Filipe Bole by 17 votes to 15. She was removed by the military regime the next day for being unwilling to work with the government, and Bole was re-imposed as chair. Following the sacking, the military regime announced that in future it would appoint provincial council chairs.

Personal life
Ganilau was married to former National Alliance Party leader Ratu Epeli Ganilau, who is the son of the late Governor-General and President, Ratu Sir Penaia Ganilau.  They have two sons and two daughters.

References

1951 births
2018 deaths
Fijian chiefs
People from Lakeba
Vuanirewa